Khorramabad-e Dineh Sar (also Romanized as Khorramābād-e Dīneh Sar; also known as Khān-e Khorramābād and Khorramābād) is a village in Farim Rural District, Dodangeh District, Sari County, Mazandaran Province, Iran. At the 2006 census, its population was 28, in 7 families.

References 

Populated places in Sari County